The Hellenizing School (Classical  Yunaban dprots, reformed spelling: Հունաբան դպրոց, Hunaban dprots), sometimes called the Philhellene or Hellenophile School, is a name given by modern scholars to the loosely-connected early medieval Armenian scholars who translated or based their works on Greek texts.

The term is used, primarily, for Armenian translators of the 6th-8th centuries who translated Greek philosophical and other texts. Unlike Golden Age (5th century) authors, their writings largely retain the Greek syntax. Greek authors whose texts were translated include Dionysius Thrax, Plato, Aristotle, Porphyry, Philon of Alexandria, Nemesius, Aratus, Gregory of Nyssa and texts such as Hermetica.

Some Armenian authors, most notably Anania Shirakatsi and David the Invincible, wrote original works, drawing extensively from Greek sources and are thus considered part of the Hellenizing School.

See also
 Graeco-Arabic translation movement, an analogue with Arab scholars

References

Bibliography

Further reading

Medieval Armenia
History of translation